Sing No Evil is the fourth studio album by the rock group Half Japanese, released in 1984 by Iridescence.

Critical reception
Craig Marks, in the Spin Alternative Record Guide, wrote that the album "finds Half Jap brushing up against normalcy--traditional song structures, metaphorical lyrics--with uneven, if sometimes booming, results."

Track listing

References 

1985 albums
Half Japanese albums